Kimsa Chata (Aymara and Quechua kimsa three, Pukina chata mountain, "three mountains", Hispanicized Quimsa Chata) is a group of three mountains in the Andes of Bolivia. It  is located in the Oruro Department, Sajama Province, in the north of the Turco Municipality. It is situated north-east of the mountains Yaritani and Wankarani. The two other peaks of the groups lie south-east of it.

References 

Mountains of Oruro Department